Maish may refer to:

People
 Levi Maish (1837–1899), American politician
 Steve Maish (born 1963), English darts player

Places
 Maish House, United States
 Maish Nunatak, Antarctica
 Maish Vaya, Arizona, United States